Diporiphora valens, the southern Pilbara spinifex dragon , southern Pilbara tree dragon, or Pilbara two-line dragon, is a species of agama found in Australia.

References

Diporiphora
Agamid lizards of Australia
Taxa named by Glen Milton Storr
Reptiles described in 1980